Princeton High School is a public, co-educational high school in Sharonville, Ohio, United States. The school is a part of the Princeton City School District.

Princeton High School offers grades nine through twelve, educating students from the Cincinnati metropolitan area communities of Evendale, Glendale, Lincoln Heights, Springdale, Sharonville, Woodlawn, Heritage Hill and portions of Blue Ash, Deerfield Township, West Chester Township, and Springfield Township since its establishment in 1955.
Princeton High School is near the intersection of interstates 75 and 275 at 100 Viking Way.

The school offers advanced placement and International Baccalaureate courses, as well as technology, music and athletic programs.  Princeton High School is accredited by the North Central Association.

Princeton High School hosts one of only 22 International Baccalaureate Diploma Programs available in Ohio. There are over 125 students who have graduated with a full International Baccalaureate (IB).

History

Princeton High School was established in 1955 and graduated its first class in 1959.  In 1955, the school districts of Woodlawn, Glendale, Springdale, Crescentville, Sharonville, Runyan, Stewart and Evendale consolidated to form the Princeton City School District.  The name was taken from the prevalent PR phone prefix used in the area and from Princeton Pike.  Princeton High School was built on its current site in 1957-58.

In 1970, the Ohio State Board of Education merged the predominantly white Princeton High School and the predominantly black Lincoln Heights High School, bringing Princeton City School District to its current boundaries.  In 2010, plans were introduced to build a campus that would house both Princeton High School and the Princeton Community Middle School. The New Campus opened in 2014.

As of the 2018-19 school year, district-wide enrollment was 6,264 students.

Extracurricular activities

Princeton offers a variety of extracurricular activities, including academic challenge team, baseball, basketball, bowling, cheerleading, chess, cross country, debate, diving, American football, golf, soccer, swimming, tennis, track and field, volleyball, water polo and wrestling.

With regard to competitive activities, Princeton High School was a founding member of the Greater Miami Conference and its students have won numerous team titles, including:

 Baseball, boys, champions 1970 (AAA) (won as Lincoln Heights HS, before merger) 
 Basketball, boys, champions 1970 (A) (won as Lincoln Heights HS, before merger) 
 Basketball, girls, champions 1987 (AAA), 2014 (Div 1), 2023 (Div 1)
 American football, boys, champions 1978, 1983, 1987 (AAA)
 Tennis, boys, champions 2003(Ohio Tennis Coaches' Association)
 Track and field, girls, champions 1989 (AAA)
 Water Polo, boys, champions 1977, 1981;

Community involvement

Princeton High School encourages community involvement by both staff and students.  In 2000, Princeton High School began involvement in the Leukemia and Lymphoma Society’s Pennies for Patients campaign – renamed Pasta for Pennies in certain markets in which the Olive Garden restaurant provides sponsorship. Princeton High School was again the top fund-raising school in the nation in 2008, when they raised over $46,000 during the three-week campaign.

Princeton High School staff and students are also active in other charitable endeavors, hosting an annual Relay For Life since 2003.  This event has raised as much as $38,000 from one overnight Relay event.

Notable alumni
 Willie Asbury, former NFL player (Pittsburgh Steelers)
 Harlon Barnett, former NFL player
 Darius Bazley, NBA player
 Ron Carpenter, former NFL player
 Shane Curry, former NFL player
 Erik Daniels, former NBA player
 Dee Davis, WNBA player
 Darryl Hardy, former NFL player
 Josh Harrison, MLB player
 Maurice Harvey, former NFL player
 Alex Higdon, former NFL player
 Carlos Hyde, NFL running back; attended freshman year
 Lance Johnson, MLB player
 Paris Johnson Jr., American football player
 Kenneth Lawson, law professor
 Kelsey Mitchell, WNBA player
 Tony Snow, Fox News broadcaster, White House Press Secretary for George W. Bush
 Spencer Ware, NFL player
 Carmen Electra, model and actress

See also
Cincinnati Marlins

Notes and references

External links
 

Educational institutions established in 1955
High schools in Hamilton County, Ohio
Public high schools in Ohio
International Baccalaureate schools in Ohio
1955 establishments in Ohio